Charles or Charlie Foster may refer to:

Politics and law
Charles Foster (New York politician) (1823–1877), American politician and lawyer
Charles Foster (Ohio politician) (1828–1904), American politician, governor of Ohio and U.S. Secretary of Treasury
Charles Foster (attorney), American immigration attorney

Religion
Charles A. Foster (Latter Day Saints) (fl. 1844), American member of the Latter-Day Saint movement
Charles H. Foster (1838–1888), American spiritualist medium
C. W. Foster (Charles Wilmer Foster, 1866–1935), English clergyman, antiquarian, historian and archivist

Sports
Red Foster (baseball) (Charles B. Foster, fl. 1907–1911), American baseball player
Charles Foster (racewalker) (1893–1943), American racewalker
Charlie Foster (1905–1983), American football, basketball, and track and field coach
Charles Foster (hurdler) (1953–2019), American hurdler

Others
Charles Foster (writer) (1923–2017), British-born Canadian publicist and writer
Charles A. Foster (born 1962), British writer, traveller and barrister

See also
Charles Foster Kane, fictional character from Orson Welles' film Citizen Kane
Charles Foster Ofdensen, fictional character from television series Metalocalypse
Charles Forster (disambiguation)
Foster (surname)